Dannie is a given name. Notable people with the name include:

 Dannie Abse (1923–2014), Welsh poet
 Dannie Bulman (born 1979), English football midfielder
 Dannie Heineman (1872–1962), Belgian-American engineer and businessman
 Dannie Lockett (born 1964), American football player
 Dannie Richmond (1935–1988), American drummer, worked with Charles Mingus, Joe Cocker, Elton John and Mark-Almond
 Dannie Seow (born 1967), Australian Rules Footballer

See also
 Dannie Heineman Prize for Astrophysics
 Dannie Heineman Prize for Mathematical Physics